Benjamin Levine Ebert is the Chair of Medical Oncology at the Dana–Farber Cancer Institute and the George P. Canellos, MD and Jean S. Canellos Professor of Medicine at Harvard Medical School.

Early life and education
Ebert was born in Boston Lying-In Hospital to parents Michael and Ellen Ebert. His father was the Chair of the department of psychiatry at Vanderbilt University School of Medicine while his mother was an artist. Due to his fathers position, Ebert and his family lived in Baltimore, Maryland, and Bethesda, Tennessee. While in Tennessee, Ebert was enrolled at the University School of Nashville where he was ranked nationally in table tennis. During high school, he also worked in the laboratory of Daryl Granner and studied gene regulation and diabetes.

Following high school, Ebert received a bachelor's degree from Williams College. As a senior, he was presented with the college's Good Citizen award for his involvement in various community projects over the years. Ebert was also elected president of the Williams juggling club and competed in cycling and running. In 1991, Ebert was named one of 32 Rhodes Scholar to study at the University of Oxford. Upon returning to North America, Ebert enrolled at Harvard Medical School (HMS) and worked with Frank Bunn whom he later listed as the primary reason for pursuing a career in hematology. He graduated from HMS in 1999 and then completed his internship and residency at Massachusetts General Hospital in 2001. He then went on to complete his clinical fellowship in hematology and oncology at Dana–Farber Cancer Institute (DFCI).

Career

During his tenure at DFCI, Ebert described the genomic landscape of adult myelodysplastic syndromes and identified RPS14 as a key gene for deletion 5q MDS. In 2011, Ebert was elected to the American Society for Clinical Investigation. In 2014, Ebert collaborated with William Kaelin on a study that found that lenalidomide, a cancer drug, targeted two proteins, IKZF1 and IFZF3, for destruction. As such, he discovered the molecular basis of lenalidomide activity in MDS as well as multiple myeloma. As a result of his research, Ebert was the recipient of the 2017 William Dameshek Prize from the American Society of Hematology. He also earned a National Cancer Institute Outstanding Investigator Award for his ongoing progressive research.

In 2018, Ebert, was elected a member of the National Academy of Medicine for his "contributions to understanding the genetics and biology of myeloid malignancies, to the characterization of clonal hematopoiesis, and for elucidating the mechanism of action of thalidomide and its analogs." He was also named a Howard Hughes Medical Institute Investigator, which granted him seven years of funding to research genetics, biology, and therapy of myeloid malignancies. In the same year, Ebert, Kenneth Anderson, and Irene Ghobrial were granted three years of funding from the Dr. Miriam and Sheldon G. Adelson Medical Research Foundation to study ways to prevent multiple myeloma from precursor states. In 2021, Ebert was recognized with the Sjöberg Prize for Cancer Research from the Royal Swedish Academy of Sciences.

References

Living people
Williams College alumni
Harvard Medical School alumni
Members of the National Academy of Medicine
Members of the American Society for Clinical Investigation
American Rhodes Scholars
Alumni of the University of Oxford
American oncologists
Year of birth missing (living people)